Calne was a parliamentary borough in Wiltshire, which elected two Members of Parliament (MPs) to the House of Commons from 1295 until 1832, and then one member from 1832 until 1885, when the borough was abolished.

History
Calne was one of the towns represented in the Model Parliament of 1295, but sent members only sporadically for the next century. However, it was continuously represented from the reign of Richard II (1377–99). From medieval times, the borough consisted of the whole of the market town of Calne in the north-west of Wiltshire, and some of the surrounding district which was part of Calne parish. In 1831, the population of the borough was 2,640, and it contained 487 houses.

The right to vote was reserved to the corporation, which consisted of two "guild stewards", appointed annually, and a varying number of ordinary members or "burgesses", who were appointed by being co-opted by the existing members. This meant that once any interested party had secured control of the corporation it was generally easy to maintain, and the owner or "patron" of the borough usually had total power to nominate both the MPs. Indeed, before 1830 there had not been a contested election in living memory.

Calne manor was bought in 1572 by Lionel Duckett, a London mercer, and his family were influential over elections in the borough for almost 200 years. By the mid 18th century, the patronage was shared between Thomas Duckett and William Northey, who generally used it to return themselves as MPs, although it could also be a source of revenue: in 1757 Duckett was paid a government pension of £500 a year to vacate his seat when Pitt the Elder wanted it for George Hay.

Between 1763 and 1765, the Earl of Shelburne (who later became Marquess of Lansdowne) bought out Duckett and Northey, and his family controlled the borough in the Whig interest for about the next 75 years. Nevertheless, the power of the corporation and the Lansdowne influence was apparently much resented. In 1807 the corporation insisted on re-electing an MP with whom they were satisfied, Joseph Jekyll, even though Lansdowne wanted to replace him. At the general election of 1826, the inhabitants attempted a revolt against Lansdowne's domination, trying to win over some of the corporation members, but the issue was not taken as far as contesting the election. At the next opportunity, however, the 1830 general election, the townsmen put up their own candidates – one of several such rebellions against local aristocratic domination which took place in boroughs across the country at that election. All 18 members of the corporation voted for the Lansdowne candidates, but 60 of the local householders attempted to vote for their nominees, and when their votes were rejected by the returning officers they petitioned to have the election overturned. However, the Commons upheld the existing franchise and confirmed the result of the election.

In the initial version of the Reform Bill as proposed to Parliament in 1830, Calne would have kept both of its MPs. This was apparently because of a misunderstanding of how the 1821 census returns had been compiled, which made Calne seem much larger than it was. In fact, other boroughs of a similar size to Calne were to lose a seat, and as Lansdowne was a member of the cabinet it was politically impossible to let Calne benefit from any anomalies. Calne became one of the causes celebres round which debate on the Bill revolved, but the government eventually transferred it to Schedule B, the list of boroughs that were to lose a seat.

Under the Great Reform Act as it was eventually passed in 1832, Calne kept one of its two seats, its boundaries being extended to bring in the whole of Calne parish and parts of the neighbouring Calstone Wellington and Blackland parishes. This increased the population to 4,795; the franchise was reformed as elsewhere, and there were 191 residents qualified to vote in the first post-Reform election. This extension of the electorate could not free the borough from the Lansdowne influence, however, and the MP was a member of the Marquess's family for all but 13 of the borough's remaining 53 years of existence.

Calne was eventually abolished as a constituency with effect from the general election of 1885, the area being included from that point in the Chippenham (or Wiltshire North West) county division.

Members of Parliament

1295–1640

1640–1832

1832–1885

Election results

Elections in the 1830s

In the 1830 election, 60 ineligible householders placed votes for Hopkinson and Cheney each. These were rejected after polling.

Macdonald was reappointed Commissioner for the Affairs of India, requiring a by-election.

Macaulay was appointed a Commissioner of the India Board, requiring a by-election.

Petty-FitzMaurice's death caused a by-election.

Elections in the 1840s

Petty-Fitzmaurice was appointed a Lord Commissioner of the Treasury, requiring a by-election.

Elections in the 1850s

Petty-Fitzmaurice resigned, causing a by-election.

Lowe was appointed Vice-President of the Committee of the Council on Education, requiring a by-election.

Elections in the 1860s

Elections in the 1870s

Elections in the 1880s

References 

 Michael Brock, The Great Reform Act (London: Hutchinson, 1973) 
 D Brunton & D H Pennington, “Members of the Long Parliament” (London: George Allen & Unwin, 1954)
Cobbett's Parliamentary history of England, from the Norman Conquest in 1066 to the year 1803 (London: Thomas Hansard, 1808) 
 F W S Craig, British Parliamentary Election Results 1832–1885 (2nd edition, Aldershot: Parliamentary Research Services, 1989)
 T. H. B. Oldfield, The Representative History of Great Britain and Ireland (London: Baldwin, Cradock & Joy, 1816)
 J Holladay Philbin, Parliamentary Representation 1832 – England and Wales (New Haven: Yale University Press, 1965)
 Frederic A Youngs, jr, "Guide to the Local Administrative Units of England, Vol I" (London: Royal Historical Society, 1979)
 

Parliamentary constituencies in Wiltshire (historic)
Constituencies of the Parliament of the United Kingdom established in 1295
Constituencies of the Parliament of the United Kingdom disestablished in 1885
Rotten boroughs

ar:كان (إنجلترا)